Rhacochilus is a genus of surfperches native to the eastern Pacific Ocean.

Species
There are currently two recognized species in this genus:
 Rhacochilus toxotes Agassiz, 1854 (Rubberlip surfperch)
 Rhacochilus vacca (Girard, 1855) (Pile perch)

References

Embiotocidae
Marine fish genera
Taxa named by Louis Agassiz